The Representation of the People (Equal Franchise) Act 1928 was an Act of the Parliament of the United Kingdom. This act expanded on the Representation of the People Act 1918 which had given some women the vote in Parliamentary elections for the first time after World War I. It is sometimes referred to as the Fifth Reform Act.

The 1928 Act widened suffrage by giving women electoral equality with men. It gave the vote to all women over 21 years old, regardless of property ownership. Prior to this act only women over 30 who met minimum property qualifications could vote.

Passing of the act
The act was passed by the Conservative Party without much opposition from other parties.

The bill became law on 2 July 1928, having been introduced in March. The leader of the National Union of Women's Suffrage Societies who had campaigned for the vote, Millicent Fawcett, was still alive and attended the parliament session to see the vote take place. She wrote in her diary the same night "It is almost exactly 61 years ago since I heard John Stuart Mill introduce his suffrage amendment to the Reform Bill on 20 May 1867. So I have had extraordinary good luck in having seen the struggle from the beginning.”

On 5 August 1928, Millicent Fawcett obtained a letter from the prime minister Stanley Baldwin. He points out that even though there were obstacles in passing the bill, he always believed it would be ratified in "the simple and complete form it ultimately assumed". He finishes the letter by expressing a hope that equal vote would be beneficial for the country and it would serve for the greater good in the United Kingdom.

Results
The Act added five million more women to the electoral roll and had the effect of making women a majority, 52.7%, of the electorate in the 1929 general election, which was termed the "Flapper Election".

See also
 Reform Acts
 Timeline of women's suffrage
 Nineteenth Amendment to the United States Constitution
 Women's suffrage in the United Kingdom
 Representation of the People Act
 Suffragette bombing and arson campaign
 Women in the House of Commons of the United Kingdom

References

Further reading
 Berthezène,  Clarisse, and Julie Gottlieb, eds., Rethinking Right-Wing Women: Gender And The Conservative Party, 1880s To The Present (Manchester UP, 2018).
 Jarvis, David. "Mrs Maggs and Betty: The Conservative Appeal to Women Voters in the 1920s." Twentieth Century British History 5.2 (1994): 129–152.
 Thackeray, David. "Building a peaceable party: masculine identities in British Conservative politics, c. 1903–24." Historical Research 85.230 (2012): 651–673.

External links
Equal Franchise Act notes on Spartacus Education
Parliament UK - Stanley Baldwin to Millicent Fawcett, 1928
The text of the Act
Image of The Representation of the People (Equal Franchise) Act 1928

United Kingdom Acts of Parliament 1928
Representation of the People Acts
Women's suffrage in the United Kingdom
Women's rights legislation
1928 in women's history
July 1928 events